Nelson Carmichael (born November 19, 1965 in Steamboat Springs, Colorado) is an American mogul skier. He won a bronze medal at the 1992 Winter Olympics.

He was with the U.S. team from 1983–1992. Carmichael was a two-time World Cup Grand Prix Mogul champion, won 12 individual World Cup event titles, was a six- time U.S. National Mogul champion and a Pro-Mogul champion.

Carmichael married fellow Olympic skier Caroline Lalive in 2012. They have one daughter (born 2015).

References

External links
 

1965 births
Living people
Freestyle skiers at the 1992 Winter Olympics
Olympic freestyle skiers of the United States
Olympic bronze medalists for the United States in freestyle skiing
Medalists at the 1992 Winter Olympics
Sportspeople from Colorado
People from Steamboat Springs, Colorado
American male freestyle skiers